Jon Kirkham (born 16 November 1984 in Derby, Derbyshire), is a British motorcycle racer best known for his performances in the National Superstock 1000 championship, Kirkham was runner up in 2009 before winning that championship in 2010. Kirkham moved into British Superbike Championship for 2011 with the Samsung crescent Suzuki team, claiming his first win in that series at Croft.

Career statistics
Stats correct as of 9 July 2012

All Time

Supersport World Championship

British Superbike Championship

 * Season still in progress

National Superstock 1000

Superstock 1000 FIM Cup

Superbike World Championship

References

1984 births
Living people
Sportspeople from Derby
British Superbike Championship riders
English motorcycle racers
Superbike World Championship riders